Pachybrachis coloradensis is a species of case-bearing leaf beetle in the family Chrysomelidae.

References

Further reading

 

coloradensis
Articles created by Qbugbot